Walter Woods may refer to:

 Walter Woods (screenwriter) (1881–1942), American screenwriter
 W. O. Woods, U.S. Treasurer
 Walt Woods (1875–1951), baseball player
 Tyrone Woods (Walter Tyrone Woods, born 1969), baseball player
 Walter Woods (politician) (1861–1939), Australian politician

See also
 Walter Wood (disambiguation)